The 1998 European Men's Handball Championship was the third edition of the tournament and held in Italy from 29 May to 7 June 1998, in the cities of Meran and Bolzano. Sweden won the tournament after defeating Spain in the final, while Germany finished third.

Qualification 

Note: Bold indicates champion for that year. Italic indicates host for that year.

Venues

Preliminary round 
All times are local (UTC+2).

Group A

Group B

Placement games

Eleventh place game

Ninth place game

Seventh place game

Fifth place game

Knockout stage

Bracket

Semifinals

Third place game

Final

Final ranking

All-Star Team 

Source: EHF

References

External links 
 Official Website (Archived)
 Results

E
H
European Men's Handball Championship
European Men's Handball
May 1998 sports events in Europe
June 1998 sports events in Europe
Sport in Bolzano
Merano